Frashëri is an Albanian surname.

People 
 Dalip Frashëri, 19th-century poet
 Shahin Frashëri, 19th-century poet
 Abdyl Frashëri, founder and head of the League of Prizren in 1878-1881.
 Naim Frashëri, member of the Albanian Society who helped publish the first Albanian letters, also author of the first Albanian books for the first Albanian school in 1887 in Korce.
 Sami Frashëri, founder of the Albanian Society, 1879. 
 Eshref Frashëri, Albanian politician, Chairman of the National Council of Albania from 1922–1923
 Mehdi Frashëri (1872–1963), Albanian politician
 Midhat Frashëri (1880-1949), Albanian politician
 Gjergj Adhamidhi bej Frashëri (Gjergj Adhamidhi), promoter of the Albanian independence and minister of finances during Prince Widits rule in 1914.
 Stivi Frashëri (born 1990), Albanian footballer

References 

Toponymic surnames